

This is a list of the National Register of Historic Places listings in Clark County, Arkansas.

This is intended to be a complete list of the properties on the National Register of Historic Places in Clark County, Arkansas, United States. The locations of National Register properties for which the latitude and longitude coordinates are included below, may be seen in a map.

There are 40 properties listed on the National Register in the county, including one site, Elkin's Ferry, which is part of the Camden Expedition Sites, a National Historic Landmark District associated with events of the Civil War. Another two properties were once listed but have been removed.

Current listings

|}

Former listing

|}

See also

List of National Historic Landmarks in Arkansas
National Register of Historic Places listings in Arkansas

References

 
Clark County